I Zingari are a wandering amateur cricket club. Founded on 4 July 1845 by three Old Harrovians, it is one of the oldest cricket clubs still in existence. The purpose of the club was to nurture amateur cricket following the rise of professionalism, which had resulted in most clubs and counties employing at least one professional player to strengthen their side. I Zingari sides were chosen carefully, and such was their strength in the late 19th and early 20th centuries that a number of their matches were considered to be of first-class status.  I Zingari Australia played senior club cricket for a few seasons after their formation in 1888, before being excluded from Electorate cricket. They have not played any first-class cricket.

I Zingari played numerous fixtures each season from 1845, primarily facing Eton College and Harrow School in the 1840s, and later playing more against stronger opposition; the Gentlemen of England and county sides became frequent opponents. In 1866 they took on the 'Gentlemen of the South' at St Lawrence Ground, Canterbury. This match is the first of their fixtures to be considered of first-class status. I Zingari lost by 121 runs to the Gentlemen, whose team included W.G. Grace and two of his brothers. I Zingari's next first-class match came eleven years later, when they played Yorkshire County Cricket Club as part of the Scarborough Festival. They competed in the festival for each of the following thirteen seasons – with the exception of 1883 – and played Yorkshire on seven occasions, the 'Gentlemen of England' six times and the touring Australians twice. They played two further first-class fixtures, both against the 'Gentlemen of England' at Lord's Cricket Ground, in 1895 and 1904.

In 17 first-class fixtures, 85 different cricketers appeared for I Zingari. Lancashire and England Test cricketer A. G. Steel appeared for the club on the most occasions, playing ten matches between 1879 and 1895. His 52 wickets are the most taken for the side by any player. Middlesex captain A. J. Webbe scored the most runs for I Zingari, accumulating 612 during his seven matches. He also scored more centuries for the amateur side than any other player, passing 100 on two occasions, while the highest score for I Zingari was 147, by Teddy Wynyard. Alfred Lyttelton, one of three Lyttelton brothers to play for the side, was the most successful wicket-keeper, claiming 17 dismissals.

Many members of the upper classes played for the side throughout their first-class years. Among these were Prince Christian Victor of Schleswig-Holstein, the only member of the British Royal Family to have played first-class cricket. Members of the peerage also played for I Zingari, including Ivo Bligh, 8th Earl of Darnley, Beilby Lawley, 3rd Baron Wenlock, Martin Hawke, 7th Baron Hawke and George Harris, 4th Baron Harris. At least three players were Members of Parliament, chief among them Alfred Lyttelton and Edward Stanhope who were both members of the Privy Council of the United Kingdom. Cecil Wilson, who appeared for the side twice, also served as an Anglican Bishop of Melanesia and Bishop of Bunbury.

Key

Cricketers

References

I Zingari
I Zingari